David Sidwick is a British politician who was elected as the Conservative Dorset Police and Crime Commissioner in the 2021 England and Wales police and crime commissioner elections. He succeeded Martyn Underhill who did not run for re-election. He is the Association of Police and Crime Commissioners’ joint co-lead on substance misuse. He previously worked in the pharmaceutical industry and has called for cannabis to re-classified from Class B to Class A in the UK.

References

External links 

 David Sidwick official website
 Twitter

Living people
Conservative Party police and crime commissioners
Politicians from Bournemouth
Year of birth missing (living people)